Angel Luis García Gutiérrez (born 1923) is a Cuban former pitcher who played in the Negro leagues in the 1940s.

A native of Cuba, García played for the Cincinnati Clowns in 1945, and played again for the team in 1946 and 1948 after it had moved to Indianapolis. In eight recorded appearances on the mound, he posted a 3.78 ERA over 52.1 innings.

References

External links
 and Seamheads

1923 births
Possibly living people
Date of birth missing
Place of birth missing
Cincinnati Clowns players
Indianapolis Clowns players